Operation HIGHJUMP, officially titled The United States Navy Antarctic Developments Program, 1946–1947, (also called Task Force 68), was a United States Navy (USN) operation to establish the Antarctic research base Little America IV. The operation was organized by Rear Admiral Richard E. Byrd, Jr., USN (Ret), Officer in Charge, Task Force 68, and led by Rear Admiral Ethan Erik Larson, USN, Commanding Officer, Task Force 68. Operation HIGHJUMP commenced 26 August 1946 and ended in late February 1947. Task Force 68 included 4,700 men, 13 ships, and 33 aircraft.

HIGHJUMP's objectives, according to the U.S. Navy report of the operation, were:

 Training personnel and testing equipment in frigid conditions;
 Consolidating and extending the United States' sovereignty over the largest practicable area of the Antarctic continent (publicly denied as a goal before the expedition ended);
 Determining the feasibility of establishing, maintaining, and utilizing bases in the Antarctic and investigating possible base sites;
 Developing techniques for establishing, maintaining, and utilizing air bases on ice, with particular attention to later applicability of such techniques to operations in interior Greenland, where conditions are comparable to those in the Antarctic;
 Amplifying existing stores of knowledge of electromagnetic, geological, geographic, hydrographic, and meteorological propagation conditions in the area;
 Supplementary objectives of the Nanook expedition (a smaller equivalent conducted off eastern Greenland).

Timeline

The Western Group of ships reached the Marquesas Islands on December 12, 1946, whereupon the USS Henderson and USS Cacapon set up weather monitoring stations. By December 24, the USS Currituck had begun launching aircraft on reconnaissance missions.

The Eastern Group of ships reached Peter I Island in late December 1946.

On December 30, 1946, the Martin PBM-5 George 1 crashed on Thurston Island killing Ensign Maxwell A. Lopez, ARM1 Wendell K. Henderson, and ARM1 Frederick W. Williams. The other 6 crew members were rescued 13 days later. These and Vance N. Woodall, who died on January 21, 1947, were the only fatalities during Operation HIGHJUMP.

On January 1, 1947, Lieutenant Commander Thompson and Chief Petty Officer John Marion Dickison  utilized "Jack Browne" masks and DESCO oxygen rebreathers to log the first dive by Americans under the Antarctic. Paul Siple was the senior U.S. War Department representative on the expedition. Siple was the same Eagle Scout who accompanied Byrd on the previous Byrd Antarctic expeditions.

The Central Group of ships reached the Bay of Whales on January 15, 1947, where they began construction of Little America IV.

Naval ships and personnel were withdrawn back to the United States in late February 1947, and the expedition was terminated due to the early approach of winter and worsening weather conditions.

Byrd discussed the lessons learned from the operation in an interview with Lee van Atta of International News Service held aboard the expedition's command ship, the USS Mount Olympus. The interview appeared in the Wednesday, March 5, 1947, edition of the Chilean newspaper El Mercurio and read in part as follows:

Admiral Richard E. Byrd warned today that the United States should adopt measures of protection against the possibility of an invasion of the country by hostile planes coming from the polar regions. The admiral explained that he was not trying to scare anyone, but the cruel reality is that in case of a new war, the United States could be attacked by planes flying over one or both poles. This statement was made as part of a recapitulation of his own polar experience, in an exclusive interview with International News Service. Talking about the recently completed expedition, Byrd said that the most important result of his observations and discoveries is the potential effect that they have in relation to the security of the United States. The fantastic speed with which the world is shrinking – recalled the admiral – is one of the most important lessons learned during his recent Antarctic exploration. I have to warn my compatriots that the time has ended when we were able to take refuge in our isolation and rely on the certainty that the distances, the oceans, and the poles were a guarantee of safety.

After the operation ended, a follow-up Operation Windmill returned to the area in order to provide ground-truthing to the aerial photography of HIGHJUMP from 1947 to 1948. Finn Ronne also financed a private operation to the same territory until 1948.

As with other U.S. Antarctic expeditions, interested persons were allowed to send letters with enclosed envelopes to the base, where commemorative cachets were added to their enclosures, which were then returned to the senders. These souvenir philatelic covers are readily available at low cost. It is estimated that at least 150,000 such envelopes were produced, though their final number may be considerably higher.

Participating units

Task Force 68
Rear Admiral Richard H. Cruzen, USN, Commanding

Eastern Group (Task Group 68.3)
Capt. George J. Dufek, USN, Commanding
 Seaplane Tender USS Pine Island. Capt. Henry H. Caldwell, USN, Commanding
 Destroyer USS Brownson. Cdr. H.M.S. Gimber, USN, Commanding
 Tanker USS Canisteo. Capt. Edward K. Walker, USN, Commanding

Western Group (Task Group 68.1)
Capt. Charles A. Bond, USN, Commanding
 Seaplane Tender USS Currituck. Capt. John E. Clark, USN, Commanding
 Destroyer USS Henderson. Capt. C.F. Bailey, USN, Commanding
 Tanker USS Cacapon. Capt. R.A. Mitchell, USN, Commanding

Central Group (Task Group 68.2)
Rear Admiral Richard H. Cruzen, USN, Commanding Officer
 Communications and Flagship USS Mount Olympus. Capt. R. R. Moore, USN, Commanding
 Supplyship USS Yancey. Capt. J.E. Cohn, USN, Commanding
 Supplyship USS Merrick. Capt. John J. Hourihan, USN, Commanding
 Submarine USS Sennet. Cdr. Joseph B. Icenhower, USN, Commanding
 Icebreaker USS Burton Island. CDR Gerald L. Ketchum, USN, Commanding
 Icebreaker USCGC Northwind. Capt. Charles W. Thomas, USCG, Commanding

Carrier Group (Task Group 68.4)
Rear Adm. Richard E. Byrd, Jr. USN, (Ret), Officer in Charge
 Aircraft carrier and flagship USS Philippine Sea. Capt. Delbert S. Cornwell, USN, Commanding

Base Group (Task Group 68.5)
Capt. Clifford M. Campbell, USN, Commanding
 Base Little America IV

Fatalities
On December 30, 1946, aviation radiomen Wendell K. Henderson, Fredrick W. Williams, and Ensign Maxwell A. Lopez were killed when their Martin PBM Mariner George 1 crashed during a blizzard. The surviving six crew members were rescued 13 days later, including aviation radioman James H. Robbins and co-pilot William Kearns. A plaque honoring the three killed crewmen was later erected at the McMurdo Station research base, and Mount Lopez on Thurston Island was named in honor of killed airman Maxwell A. Lopez. In December 2004, an attempt was made to locate the remains of the plane. In 2007 a group called the George One Recovery Team was unsuccessful in trying to get direct military involvement and raise extensive funds from the United States Congress to try and find the bodies of the three men killed in the crash.

On January 21, 1947, Vance N. Woodall died during a "ship unloading accident". In a crew profile, deckman Edward Beardsley described his worst memory as "when Seaman Vance Woodall died on the Ross Ice Shelf under a piece of roller equipment designed to 'pave' the ice to build an airstrip."

In media
The documentary about the expedition The Secret Land was filmed entirely by military photographers (both USN and US Army) and narrated by actors Robert Taylor, Robert Montgomery, and Van Heflin. It features Chief of Naval Operations Fleet Admiral Chester W. Nimitz in a scene where he is discussing Operation HIGHJUMP with admirals Byrd and Cruzen. The film re-enacted scenes of critical events, such as shipboard damage control and Admiral Byrd throwing items out of an airplane to lighten it to avoid crashing into a mountain. It won the 1948 Academy Award for Best Documentary Feature Film.

See also
 List of Antarctic expeditions
 Military activity in the Antarctic
 New Swabia

References

Bibliography

Further reading
 Navy Proudly Ends Its Antarctic Mission; Air National Guard Assumes 160-Year Task. Chicago Tribune; February 22, 1998.
 Antarctic Mayday: The Crash of the George One. Story of one of the survivors – James Haskin (Robbie) Robbins
 Operation Highjump: A Tragedy on the Ice

External links
 
 The Papers of Harry B. Eisenberg Jr. at Dartmouth College Library

History of Antarctica
United States and the Antarctic
Oceanography
Military in Antarctica
Aviation in Antarctica
1946 in Antarctica
1947 in Antarctica
History of the Ross Dependency